Gnaphosa lugubris is a ground spider species found from Europe to Central Asia.

It is recorded in the fauna list of Parley Common, a Site of Special Scientific Interest in Dorset, England.

See also 
 List of Gnaphosidae species

References 

Gnaphosidae
Spiders of Europe
Spiders of Asia
Spiders described in 1839